Gerda Kupferschmied (born 19 August 1942) is a German athlete. She competed in the women's high jump at the 1964 Summer Olympics.

References

External links
 

1942 births
Living people
Sportspeople from Cottbus
People from the Province of Brandenburg
German female high jumpers
Olympic athletes of the United Team of Germany
Athletes (track and field) at the 1964 Summer Olympics
East German Athletics Championships winners